Kathleen Pelham Burn Moore, Countess of Drogheda  (1887 – 18 March 1966) was a British socialite, aviator, and sportswoman. She was one of the "bright young things".

Biography 
Pelham Burn was interested in various pursuits. Turtle Bunbury describes her as "an enigmatic cigarette-smoking 20th century lady famous for dabbling in the occult".

Born to a wealthy family (her mother's side from mining, her father's Scottish landowners), she had the ability to "pursue her manifold interests with great vigour" from her youth. She was particularly interested in flying; she became one of the first women to fly as a passenger in a plane. She later became known as "the Flying Countess" for her many passenger journeys and then for flying in aircraft exhibitions across the UK and Ireland to raise money for the Royal Air Force during World War II. She had also worked for aviation charities during World War I, and was a guest at Edward Maitland's pre-flight celebrations of the R34 successfully attempting the first return Atlantic crossing.

Her other interests included driving fashionable cars around London and playing tennis at All England Lawn Tennis and Croquet Club (Wimbledon), being one of its first members. She competed in The Championships, Wimbledon once, in 1914, though she went out in the second round. She also played a lot of golf, and was a lover of contemporary art, but not music or literature.

Bunbury notes that she held séances that were social events attended by celebrities of the day, including Jacob Epstein, Augustus John, and Wyndham Lewis.

In 1919 she was appointed Companion, Order of St. Michael and St. George. She was also a Commander of the Order of the British Empire.

Personal life 

Pelham Burn's first husband was the Anglo-Irish civil servant Henry Ponsonby Moore, 10th Earl of Drogheda. They wed on 3 March 1909 and divorced in 1922; Pelham Burn filed for divorce in 1921 on account of Henry's unfaithfulness. The marriage gave two children: Charles (born 1910) and Patricia (born 1912), whom Pelham Burn was granted custody of in the divorce. The couple had been married in "a grand ceremony in St. Giles's Cathedral, Edinburgh" and lived in London at 40 Wilton Crescent; they also owned Moore Abbey. Charles later said that his parents seemed to live separate lives and their divorce was not surprising.

On 31 August 1922, Pelham Burn married Guillermo "Billy" de Landa y Escandon, a Mexican playboy and son of former Mexico City Governor Guillermo Landa y Escandón. They divorced in 1929.

She is accounted by her son as being bisexual, as he wrote: "All her life she was attracted by men and women [...] she knew intimately Donald Campbell, Alan Cobham, Kaye Don, Jim Mollison, Amy Johnson, and plenty of others besides." She may have also had an affair with Wyndham Lewis during her first marriage, whom she also commissioned for art against her husband's wishes.

References 

1887 births
1966 deaths
Aviation pioneers
Bisexual women
British women aviators
British female tennis players
British socialites
Commanders of the Order of the British Empire
Companions of the Order of St Michael and St George
Drogheda
Scottish noblewomen